Pycnanthemum tenuifolium, the  narrowleaf mountainmint, slender mountainmint, common horsemint or Virginia thyme, is a perennial herbaceous plant in the mint family, Lamiaceae. It is native to central and eastern North America.

Description
As with other mints, the stems are square in cross section. The flowers are white, borne in dense, half-round heads in summer, June through September. Unlike most plants in the genus, the foliage has a very faint mint fragrance.

Etymology
Pycnanthemum is based on the Greek words pyknós (dense) and ανθέμιον (flower). Tenuifolium is from the Latin words tenuis (thin) and folium (leaf).

Distribution and habitat
P. tenuifolium is native to central and eastern North America, from Texas in the west to Maine in the east, Canada in the North, and Florida in the south. Native habitats include dry, open, rocky woods, dry prairies and fields, roadsides, pine barrens, streams, and open wet thickets.

Ecology
The plant attracts native bees, bumblebees, honey bees, and butterflies.

References

External links

 USDA Plants Profile for Pycnanthemum tenuifolium (narrowleaf mountainmint)
 USDA NRCS Plant Guide: Pycnanthemum tenuifolium

tenuifolium
Flora of Eastern Canada
Flora of the Northeastern United States
Flora of the North-Central United States
Flora of the United States
Flora of the Southeastern United States
Flora of the Appalachian Mountains
Flora of the Great Lakes region (North America)
Least concern flora of the United States
Plants described in 1809